William Hervey Allen Jr. (December 8, 1889 – December 28, 1949) was an American educator, poet, and writer. He is best known for his work Anthony Adverse (made into a 1936 movie of the same name), regarded by many critics "as the model and precursor of the contemporary American historical novel."

Early life
Allen was born in Pittsburgh, Pennsylvania, on December 8, 1889, to William Hervey Allen and Helen Ebey Myers. He graduated from Shady Side Academy in 1909. He was a midshipman with the United States Navy from 1909 to 1910, and attended the United States Naval Academy from 1910 to 1911 when he was honorably discharged due to a track and field injury.

Allen received a BS in economics from the University of Pittsburgh in 1915 where he contributed to the humor magazine The Pitt Panther.  While at college, he also became a member of the Sigma Chi Fraternity.

Allen served as a 2nd lieutenant in the 18th Pennsylvania Infantry on the Mexican border in 1916 during the Pancho Villa Expedition. That year he published a collection of poems, Ballads of the Border. He also served as a lieutenant, and later a company commander of Company "B" of the 1st Battalion, 111th Infantry Regiment o the 28th (keystone) Division, United States Army during World War I and fought in the Aisne-Marne offensive July–August 1918.  He was wounded in action at Fismes in August 1918. He also taught English to French soldiers at Favernay.

Academic career
Allen became a Professor of English at the University of Pittsburgh. For a period of time, he taught at the Porter Military Academy in Charleston, South Carolina. He also taught English at Charleston High School which at that time, although public, was only for boys (girls went to Memminger High School.) There he met and befriended DuBose Heyward. They collaborated on a volume of poems, Carolina Chansons (1922).

In 1925, he lectured on American Literature at Columbia University. From 1926 to 1927, he was a lecturer on modern poetry at Vassar College, where he met his future wife.

Writing career 
He wrote Toward the Flame (1926), a nonfictional account of his experiences in the war. His book, Wampum and Old Gold, was awarded the Yale Younger Poets Prize. Allen is best known for his work Anthony Adverse. The book sold well and the royalties supported Allen and his family for the rest of his life.

Allen greatly admired Thomas Jefferson. "Interest in American history and in a sort of American utopianism would characterize most of his later works." He planned a series of novels about colonial America called The Disinherited. He completed three works in the series: The Forest and the Fort (1943), Bedford Village (1944), and Toward the Morning (1948). The novels tell the story of Salathiel Albine, a frontiersman kidnapped as a boy by Shawnee Indians in the 1750s. All three works were collected and published as the City in the Dawn. Allen also wrote Israfel (1926), a biography of American writer Edgar Allan Poe.

In the 1940s, he co-edited the Rivers of America Series with Carl Carmer. Allen was a good friend of Marjory Stoneman Douglas and instigated her writing The Everglades: River of Grass. Allen was also close friends with Robert Frost and Ogden Nash.

Personal life 
He married Ann Andrews on June 30, 1927. The marriage to his much younger former student was viewed as somewhat scandalous, and the couple took up residence in Bermuda. They had three children: Marcia, Mary Ann and Richard.

Death and legacy 
Allen died at his home, called the Glades, in Coconut Grove, Florida, aged 60, from a heart attack, and was found by his wife. He is buried in section 3 GN 1730C in Arlington National Cemetery in Washington D.C.

Selected works 
 
 Toward the Flame, George H. Doran Company, 1926   
 Israfel: The Life and Times of Edgar Allan Poe (1926) reissued 1934.
 Anthony Adverse (1933) 
 Action at Aquila, Farrar & Rinehart, (1938)
 The Forest and the Fort (1943)
 Bedford Village (1944)
 Toward the Morning (1948)
 The City in the Dawn (1950)
   (reprint)

Sources

See also
Anthony Adverse (1936 Hollywood film)

References
Hervey Allen Papers (Hervey Allen Papers, 1831–1965, SC.1952.01, Special Collections Department, University of Pittsburgh)

External links
 Biographical Sketch by Ryan Cannon
 The Rivers of America Series, A Descriptive Bibliography, Carol Fitzgerald, 2001
 
 Works by Hervey Allen at Project Gutenberg Australia
 
 
 

1889 births
1949 deaths
20th-century American novelists
20th-century American male writers
American historical novelists
United States Army personnel of World War I
Edgar Allan Poe scholars
Members of the American Academy of Arts and Letters
University of Pittsburgh alumni
Writers from Pittsburgh
Yale Younger Poets winners
20th-century American poets
American male novelists
American male poets
Charleston Renaissance
Burials at Arlington National Cemetery
Novelists from Pennsylvania
United States Army officers